Worman is a surname. Notable people with the surname include:

Howard Worman (born 1959), American physician
Ludwig Worman (1761–1822), American politician
Martin Worman (1945–1993), American actor
Nancy Worman (born 1963), American classicist
Richard Worman (born 1933), American politician
Rick Worman (born 1963), American football coach